Okenia angelensis common name Los Angeles Okenia, is a species of sea slug, specifically a dorid nudibranch, a marine gastropod mollusc in the family Goniodorididae.

Distribution
This species was described from California. It is known from San Francisco Bay south to Mexico and has been reported from Chile.

Description
This Okenia has a narrow body and seven to eight pairs of short lateral papillae. There are another eight papillae on the back, a pair in front of the rhinophores, two in the middle of the back and two pairs of two on either side of these, in front of the gills. The body is translucent and has many small spots of brown and larger spots of white pigment. It is similar in shape and arrangement of the papillae to Okenia mija, Okenia zoobotryon, Okenia harastii and Okenia distincta.

Ecology
The diet of this species is a bryozoan, possibly a species of Amathia or Bowerbankia which lives in shallow water and on floating structures.

References

Goniodorididae
Gastropods described in 1966